The Narwhal is a species of whale with a distinctive long tusk.

Narwhal may also refer to:
 Narwhal (whaling vessel), a whaling ship used between 1883 and 1907
 HMS Narwhal, several ships of the British Royal Navy
 USS Narwhal, several US Navy ships
 Narwhal-class submarine, US submarines
 Project Narwhal, a computer program used in Barack Obama's 2012 presidential campaign
The Narwhal, Canadian environmental magazine
Nexter Narwhal, a 20mm remotely controlled naval autocannon made by Nexter

See also 
 Narwal (disambiguation)
 Narval (disambiguation)
 Narwhale (Dungeons & Dragons)